Abdoul Karim Sylla (born 10 January 1981) is a Guinean former professional footballer who played as a midfielder.

Club career
Sylla was born in Fria. He previously played for KSC Lokeren in the Belgian First Division and Diyarbakirspor in the Turkish Süper Lig.

International career
He was part of the Guinean 2004 African Nations Cup team, who finished second in their group in the first round of competition, before losing in the quarter finals to Mali.

References

External links
 
 
 Profile & stats - Lokeren

1981 births
Living people
People from Fria
Association football midfielders
Guinean footballers
Guinean expatriate footballers
Belgian Pro League players
Süper Lig players
AS Kaloum Star players
ASEC Mimosas players
Ashanti Gold SC players
Satellite FC players
K.S.C. Lokeren Oost-Vlaanderen players
R.W.D.M. Brussels F.C. players
Diyarbakırspor footballers
Hafia FC players
Abdoul Karim Sylla
Expatriate footballers in Ivory Coast
Expatriate footballers in Ghana
Guinean expatriate sportspeople in Ivory Coast
2004 African Cup of Nations players
Guinea international footballers